George Gale & Co. Ltd was a Hampshire brewery with a distinctive range of, mainly, bitter beers.  Founded in 1847 it was bought by the London brewers, Fuller's of Chiswick in 2005. The brewery was closed in 2006 with production transferred to Chiswick.

History

Established in 1847 Gales Brewery (George Gale & Co. Ltd) was an old brewery situated in Horndean, on the edge of Waterlooville, near Portsmouth in Hampshire, England. It made the nutty HSB (Horndean Special Bitter) and the newer Gales Bitter. It took its water from its own well situated under the brewery which is fed from the South Downs, and the yeast and 'liquor' (local water used for brewing), coupled with the local brewing style, produced beers with a sparse head, quite dark in colour.

In late 2005 Fuller, Smith & Turner bought Gales for £92 million.  It raised fears as to the future of Gales Horndean brewery and some of its beers, and the Campaign for Real Ale (CAMRA) launched a campaign to encourage Fuller's to continue production of the full Gales line at Horndean.  However, in January 2006, Fuller's began cutting jobs at the Horndean brewery, and it was announced on 27 February 2006 that the brewery would close at the end of March 2006, although distribution and warehousing would continue in the area.

At that point, production of the Gales brands moved to Fuller's Griffin Brewery in Chiswick, London, with the exception of Gales Bitter which was discontinued.

As of 2017, most of the brewery site has been replaced with apartments and retail shops. The main tower remains standing and was converted alongside the construction of new buildings into apartments.

Beverages

Standard Varieties

 Gales Light Ale
Other discontinued draught & keg ( pressured) beers *XXX Light Mild, *XXXD Dark Mild, *777 Keg Mild, *Gales Keg Bitter
Other discontinued bottled beers *Nut Brown

Limited Edition Brews

Last Drop = The last ale brewed at the Gales Brewery before its closure in 2006.
Gales Trafalgar 200 = Was first brewed in 2005 to celebrate the bicentenary of Nelson's famous victory. 
Gales Clubhouse Bitter =
Gales Crowning Glory = Was brewed to celebrate the Queen's Golden Jubilee in 2002.
Gales Millennium Brew = Was brewed to celebrate the new millennium in 2000.
Gales Conquest Ale
Gales D-Day Ale
Gales Silver Jubilee Ale = Was brewed to celebrate the Queen's Silver Jubilee in 1977
Gales Royal Wedding Ale = Was brewed to celebrate the 1981 Royal Wedding.
Gales Portsmouth 800 Ale = Was brewed to celebrate the 800th anniversary of Portsmouth in 1994.
Gales Golden Jubilee Ale = Was brewed to celebrate the Queen's Golden Jubilee in 2002.
Gales Victory Ale
Gales Vanguard Ale

References

Links

Defunct breweries of the United Kingdom
British companies established in 1847
1847 establishments in England
Food and drink companies established in 1847
Defunct companies of England